Chris Cramer (1948–2021) was a British news journalist and executive.

Chris Cramer may also refer to:

Christopher J. Cramer, American university administrator and research chemist

See also
Chris Kramer (disambiguation)